In numerical analysis, inverse iteration (also known as the inverse power method) is an iterative eigenvalue algorithm. It allows one to find an approximate
eigenvector when an approximation to a corresponding eigenvalue is already known.
The method is conceptually similar to  the power method.
It appears to have originally been developed to compute resonance frequencies in the field of structural mechanics.

The inverse power iteration algorithm starts with an approximation  for the eigenvalue corresponding to the desired eigenvector and a vector , either a randomly selected vector or an approximation to the eigenvector. The method is described by the iteration

At every iteration, the vector  is multiplied by the matrix  and normalized.
It is exactly the same formula as in the power method, except replacing the matrix  by 
The closer the approximation  to the eigenvalue is chosen, the faster the algorithm converges; however, incorrect choice of   can lead to slow convergence or to the convergence to an eigenvector other than the one desired. In practice, the method is used when a good approximation for the eigenvalue is known, and hence one needs only few (quite often just one) iterations.

Theory and convergence 

The basic idea of the power iteration is choosing an initial vector  (either an eigenvector approximation or a random vector) and iteratively calculating .  Except for a set of zero measure, for any initial vector, the result will converge to an eigenvector corresponding to the dominant eigenvalue.

The inverse iteration does the same for the matrix  , so it converges to the eigenvector corresponding to the dominant eigenvalue of the matrix . 

Conclusion: The method converges to the eigenvector of the matrix  corresponding to the closest eigenvalue to  

In particular, taking  we see that  

Speed of  convergence  

Let us analyze the rate of convergence of the method.

The power method is known to converge linearly to the limit, more precisely:

hence for the inverse iteration method similar result sounds as:

This is a key formula for understanding the method's convergence. It shows that if  is chosen close enough to some  eigenvalue  , for example  each iteration will improve the accuracy   times. (We use that for small enough  "closest to " and "closest to " is the same.) Hence if one is able to find , such that the 
 will be small enough, then very few iterations may be satisfactory.

Complexity 

The inverse iteration algorithm requires solving a linear system or calculation of the inverse matrix.
For non-structured matrices (not sparse, not Toeplitz,...) this requires  operations.

Implementation options 

The method is defined by the formula:

There are, however, multiple options for its implementation.

Calculate inverse matrix or solve system of linear equations 

We can rewrite the formula in the following way:

emphasizing that to find the next approximation   we may solve a system of linear equations. 
There are two options: one may choose an algorithm that solves a linear system, or one may calculate the inverse  and then apply it to the vector.
Both options have complexity O(n3), the exact number depends on the chosen method.

The choice depends also on the number of iterations. Naively, if at each iteration one solves a linear system, the complexity will be k*O(n3), where k is number of iterations; similarly, calculating the inverse matrix and applying it at each iteration is of complexity k*O(n3).
Note, however, that if the eigenvalue estimate  remains constant, then we may reduce the complexity to O(n3) + k*O(n2) with either method.
Calculating the inverse matrix once, and storing it to apply at each iteration is of complexity O(n3) + k*O(n2).

Inverting the matrix will typically have a greater initial cost, but lower cost at each iteration. Conversely, solving systems of linear equations will typically have a lesser initial cost, but require more operations for each iteration.

Tridiagonalization, Hessenberg form 

If it is necessary to perform many iterations (or few iterations, but for many eigenvectors), then it might be wise to bring the matrix to the 
upper Hessenberg form first (for symmetric matrix this will be tridiagonal form).  Which costs  arithmetic operations using a technique based on Householder reduction), with a finite sequence of orthogonal similarity transforms, somewhat like a two-sided QR decomposition.  (For QR decomposition, the Householder rotations are multiplied only on the left, but for the Hessenberg case they are multiplied on both left and right.) For  symmetric matrices this procedure costs  arithmetic operations using  a technique based on Householder reduction.

Solution of the system of linear equations for the tridiagonal matrix
costs  operations, so the complexity grows like , where  is the iteration number, which is better than for the direct inversion. However, for few iterations such transformation may not be practical.

Also transformation to the Hessenberg form involves square roots and the division operation, which are not universally supported by hardware.

Choice of the normalization constant  

On general purpose processors (e.g. produced by Intel) the execution time of addition, multiplication and division is approximately equal. But on embedded and/or low energy consuming hardware (digital signal processors, FPGA, ASIC) division may not be supported by hardware, and so should be avoided. 

When implementing the algorithm using fixed-point arithmetic, the choice of the constant  is especially important.

Usage   

The main application of the method is the situation when an approximation to an eigenvalue is found and one needs to find the corresponding approximate eigenvector. In such a situation the inverse iteration is the main and probably the only method to use.

Methods to find approximate eigenvalues 

Typically, the method is used in combination with some other method which finds approximate eigenvalues: the standard example is the bisection eigenvalue algorithm, another example is the Rayleigh quotient iteration, which is actually the same inverse iteration with the choice of the approximate eigenvalue as the Rayleigh quotient corresponding to the vector obtained on the previous step of the iteration.

There are some situations where the method can be used by itself, however they are quite marginal.

Norm of matrix as approximation to the dominant eigenvalue 

The dominant eigenvalue can be easily estimated for any matrix. 
For any induced norm it is true that
 for any eigenvalue . 
So taking the norm of the matrix as an approximate eigenvalue one can see that the method will converge to the dominant eigenvector.

Estimates based on statistics 

In some real-time applications one needs to find  eigenvectors  for matrices with  a speed of millions of matrices per second. In such applications, typically the statistics of matrices is known in advance and one can take as an approximate eigenvalue the average eigenvalue for some large matrix sample.
Better, one may calculate the mean ratio of the eigenvalues to the trace or the norm of the  matrix and estimate the average eigenvalue as the trace or norm multiplied by the average value of that ratio.  Clearly such a method can be used only with discretion and only when high precision is not critical. 
This approach of estimating an average eigenvalue can be combined with other methods to avoid excessively large error.

See also 
Power iteration
Rayleigh quotient iteration
 List of eigenvalue algorithms

References

Numerical linear algebra